This article is mainly about the South Korean word processor. See Hunminjeongeum for details on the Korean writing system.

Hunminjeongeum (훈민정음) is a Korean language word processor designed by Samsung Electronics. Its filename extension is  It was first released in 1992 as South Korea's first fully corporate-sponsored word processor.

See also 
 Hangul (word processor)

References

External links 
 Official English Website

Communications in South Korea
Windows word processors
1992 software